The 2021–22 Algerian Ligue 2 was the 58th season of the Algerian Ligue 2 since its establishment. The competition was organized by the Ligue Nationale de football Amateur (LNFA) and the system changed into two groups of 16. It began on 26 October 2021 and concluded in May 2022.

Stadiums and locations

Group Centre-east
Note: Table lists in alphabetical order.

Group Centre-west
Note: Table lists in alphabetical order.

Locations

League tables

Group Centre-east

Group Centre-west

See also
 2021–22 Algerian Ligue Professionnelle 1

References

External links
 Ligue Nationale de Football Amateur
 Algerian Football Federation

Algerian Ligue 2 seasons
Algeria